Nitrogen-15 (15N) tracing is a technique to study the nitrogen cycle using the heavier, stable nitrogen isotope 15N. Despite the different weights, 15N is involved in the same chemical reactions as the more abundant 14N and is therefore used to trace and quantify conversions of one nitrogen compound to another. 15N tracing is applied in biogeochemistry, soil science, environmental science, environmental microbiology and small molecule activation research.

Applications 
15N tracing allows researchers to distinguish specific nitrogen conversions from a network of simultaneous reactions; e.g. ammonium can at the same time be oxidised by autotrophic microorganisms, produced by mineralisation of organic matter, produced by dissimilatory nitrate reduction and assimilated by microbes and plants. In this case, quantifying the absolute amounts of ammonium does not explain how it is produced or consumed. However, the conversion of one 15N labelled compound to another can directly be linked through the isotopic signature.

15N tracing has been applied to quantify rates of nitrogen transformations in soil and to distinguish the sources of the greenhouse gas nitrous oxide under different environmental conditions.

Methodical approaches 
The two main approaches are natural abundance and enrichment techniques.

Natural abundance techniques 
Natural abundance techniques can be applied without artificial disturbance. The natural 15N abundances are expressed in delta (δ) notation relative to the 15N concentration in the air. Due to enzymatic discrimination, natural 15N abundances change slightly in microbially mediated reactions in soil. Apart from δ values, the site preference of 15N and 14N (isotopomers) for the inner or outer position within the nitrous oxide molecule has been used to determine its sources (nitrification or denitrification).

Enrichment techniques 
When nitrogen substrates are artificially enriched (labeled) with 15N, the product of a reaction can directly be linked to its substrate. In contrast to natural abundance techniques, 15N labeling allows to precisely calculate reaction rates. The amendment of additional nitrogen can also be a bias by changing natural nitrogen transformations. In agricultural soil, however, application of 15N enriched tracers, such as ammonium and nitrate, resembles conventional fertilisation practise.

A way to calculate nitrogen transformation rates in soil can be achieved by numerical approximation that takes different, simultaneous nitrogen transformations into account. A numerical tool to study the nitrogen cycle is the Ntrace model based on a Markov chain Monte Carlo simulation.

References 

 
Nitrogen cycle